Søvnløs may refer to:

Søvnløs (album), fourth studio album by Norwegian hard rock band Skambankt
"Søvnløs" (KESI song), song by Norwegian rapper KESI from his 2014 album Barn af byen
"Søvnløs" (Burhan G song), song by Burhan G from his 2010 self-titled album Burhan G 
"Søvnløs", 2014 song by Danish L.I.G.A